Nikulino is a rural locality (a village) in Vladimir, Vladimir Oblast, Russia. The population was 139 as of 2010. There are 2 streets.

Geography 
Nikulino is located 13 km southeast of Vladimir. Shepelevo is the nearest rural locality.

References 

Rural localities in Vladimir Urban Okrug